is a women's volleyball team based in Okayama city, Okayama, Japan.  It plays in V.League Division 1. The club was founded in 1999.

Honours
V.League/V.Premiere League
Champions (0):
Runners-up (2): 2013-14, 2019–20
V.Challenge League
Champions (1): 2017-2018
Runners-up (0)
Kurowashiki All Japan Volleyball Championship
Champions (0):
Runners-up (1): 2005
Empress's Cup
Champions (0):
Runners-up (1): 2013
Domestic Sports Festival (Volleyball)
Champions (10): 2002-2006, 2008-2011 and 2014-2015

League results

Current squad
2021-2022 Squad as of 9 September - 2021 

 Head coach:  Akiyoshi Kawamoto

Former players 

Domestic players

Mari Nomura (1992–2009)
Yumiko Ono (2003–2009)
Nobuko Yonemura (2002–2011)
Chie Kanda (1990–2010)
Mayumi Kosuge (2000–2011) 
Rie Hotta (2008–2011)
Hiroko Okano (1995–2013)
Kazuyo Mori (1995–2012)
Megumi Kurihara (2012–2014)
Yuki Sasaki (2012–2014)
Natsumi Horiguchi (2010–2014)
Mai Fukuda (2009–2014)
Mai Yamaguchi (2002-2019)
Koyuki Okusu (2016-2019)
Moe Sasaki (2012–2020)
Minami Yoshida (2006–2020)
Aki Kawabata (2008–2018)
Mayu Takada (2016–2019) Transferred to 9-person Ibiden Regulus
Hinako Hayashi (2015–2019) Transferred to 9-person Panasonic Bluebells
Sanae Watanabe (2017–2021) Transferred to PFU BlueCats
Minami Nishimura (2017–2021)
Anna Imura (2014–2021)
Aki Maruyama (2009–2021)
Yurika Kouno (2014–2021)

Foreign players

Thanacha Sooksod (2022–Present)

References

Japanese volleyball teams
Volleyball clubs established in 1999
Sport in Okayama
Sports teams in Okayama Prefecture
1999 establishments in Japan